Luribay (Aymara: Luriway) is a location in the La Paz Department in Bolivia. It is the seat of the Luribay Municipality, the first municipal section of the José Ramón Loayza Province, and of the province.

References 

Populated places in La Paz Department (Bolivia)